Founded in 1995, the Yancey Richardson Gallery is a dealer of fine art photography, based in New York City and founded by Yancey Richardson. Formerly housed in the 560 Broadway building in Soho, the gallery moved to New York's Chelsea art district (525 W 22nd) in 2000.

Yancey Richardson: owner 

Richardson received a B.A and M.A. from Southern Methodist University, Dallas, Texas, and held the Helena Rubinstein Fellowship in curatorial and critical studies at The Whitney Museum of American Art in 1979. She has served on a variety of boards and committees and has been active in supporting organizations such as the Public Art Fund, the International Center of Photography, and the Renaissance Society. She has moderated panels on contemporary photography for New York University and has been a guest speaker at Christie's Education program. For twelve years she served as Vice President of the Association of International Photography Art Dealers. She lives in New York with her husband and daughter.

Artists 

Yancey Richardson's current program includes photographers such as Alex Prager, Zanele Muholi, Victoria Sambunaris, Sharon Core, Mitch Epstein, Laura Letinsky, Andrew Moore, Sebastiao Salgado, Hellen van Meene, August Sander, Ed Ruscha, William Eggleston, and Robert Mapplethorpe.

Gallery artists 

 Olivo Barbieri
 Chan Chao
 Bruce Cratsley
 Mario Cravo Neto
 Mitch Epstein
 Lynn Geesaman
 David Hilliard
 Tom Hunter
 Kenneth Josephson
 Kahn & Selesnick
 Yousuf Karsh
 Lisa Kereszi
 Hiroh Kikai
 Laura Letinsky
 Alex MacLean
 Christopher Makos
 Priscilla Monge
 Andrew Moore
 Zanele Muholi
 Eliot Porter
 Alex Prager
 Sebastião Salgado
 August Sander
 Masato Seto
 Julius Shulman
 Sigga Björg Sigurðardóttir
 Mark Steinmetz
 Susan Unterberg
 Bertien van Manen
 Hellen Van Meene
 Todd Webb
 Rachel Perry Welty
 Masao Yamamoto

Additional works 

 Berenice Abbott
 Ansel Adams
 Lewis Baltz
 Bernd and Hilla Becher
 Harry Callahan
 Henri Cartier-Bresson
 William Eggleston
 Elliott Erwitt
 Adam Fuss
 Graciela Iturbide
 Barbara Kasten
 André Kertész
 O. Winston Link
 Robert Mapplethorpe
 Mary Ellen Mark
 Vik Muniz
 Ed Ruscha
 Stephen Shore
 Alfred Stieglitz
 Edward Weston
 Minor White
 Garry Winogrand

Publications 
 Olivo Barbieri: Site Specific Roma (2006)
 Olivo Barbieri: Dolomites Project (2010)
 Olivo Barbieri: Site Specific New York (2007)
 Olivo Barbieri: The Waterfall Project
 Chan Chao: Burma: Something Went Wrong
 Sharon Core: Early American (2012)
 Mitch Epstein: Family Business
 Mitch Epstein: American Power
 Terry Evans: Terry Evans: From Prairie to Field
 Lynn Geesaman: Poetics of Place
 Lynn Geesaman: Hazy Lights and Shadows
 Lynn Geesaman: Gardenscapes
 Jitka Hanzlova: Mapfre Foundation Retrospective (2012)
 David Hilliard: Photographs
 Kahn & Selesnick: The Apollo Prophecies
 Lisa Kereszi: Fun and Games (2009)
 Lisa Kereszi: Fantasies (2008)
 Andrew Moore and Lisa Kereszi: Governors Island
 Lisa Kereszi: Joe's Junk Yard
 Hiroh Kikai: Asakusa Portraits
 Hiroh Kikai: Tokyo Labyrinth
 Alex MacLean: Over: The American Landscape at the Tipping Point
 Alex MacLean: Up on the Roof: New York's Hidden Skyline
 Bertien Van Manen: Let's Sit Down Before We Go (2011)
 Esko Mannikko: The Female Pike (2nd edition)
 Esko Mannikko: Mexas
 Andrew Moore: Cuba (2012)
 Andrew Moore: Detroit Disassembled (2010)
 Mario Cravo Neto: Laroye
 Alex Prager: The Big Valley / Week-end
 Sebastiao Salgado: Migrations
 Kahn and Selesnick: Apollo Prophecies (2006)
 Mike Smith: You're Not from Around Here
 Mark Steinmetz: South Central
 Susan Unterberg: Doubletakes

References

External links 
 
 Blouin Artinfo

Art galleries established in 1995
Art museums and galleries in Manhattan
Photography museums and galleries in the United States
Chelsea, Manhattan